Rudolf "Ru" Jacob van der Haar (6 October 1913 in Banjoemas, Java, Dutch East Indies – 15 May 1943 in Maoemere, Dutch East Indies) was a Dutch field hockey player who competed in the 1936 Summer Olympics. He was a member of the Dutch field hockey team, which won the bronze medal. He played all five matches as halfback.

He died in a Japanese camp during World War II.

References

External links
 
profile

1913 births
1943 deaths
Dutch male field hockey players
Olympic field hockey players of the Netherlands
Field hockey players at the 1936 Summer Olympics
Olympic bronze medalists for the Netherlands
Olympic medalists in field hockey
People from Banyumas Regency
Medalists at the 1936 Summer Olympics
Dutch military personnel killed in World War II
Dutch prisoners of war in World War II
World War II prisoners of war held by Japan
Dutch people who died in prison custody
Prisoners who died in Japanese detention
Royal Netherlands East Indies Army personnel of World War II